is a railway station on the Aizu Railway Aizu Line in Aizuwakamatsu, Fukushima Prefecture, Japan, operated by the Aizu Railway..

Lines
Ōkawadamukōen Station is served by the Aizu Line, and is located 16.2 rail kilometers from the official starting point of the line at Nishi-Wakamatsu Station.

Station layout
Ōkawadamukōen Station has a single side platform serving traffic in both directions. There is no station building, but only a waiting room. The station is unattended.

Adjacent stations

History
The station was renamed to its present name on July 16, 1987.

Surrounding area
 Japan National Route 118
 Ōkawa Dam

In media 
The 4th episode of the TV series "Tetsu Ota Michiko, 20,000 km" is dedicated to this station

References

External links

 Aizu Railway Station information 

Railway stations in Fukushima Prefecture
Aizu Line
Railway stations in Japan opened in 1987